1773 Rumpelstilz, a main-belt asteroid
 Polo Hofer#Rumpelstilz, a Swiss pop music group

See also:
 Rumpelstilzchen, German name of Rumpelstiltskin